Sassenburg is a municipality in the district of Gifhorn, Lower Saxony, Germany. It is situated approximately 7 km northeast of Gifhorn, and 15 km northwest of Wolfsburg. Sassenburg includes the villages of Dannenbüttel, Grußendorf, Neudorf-Platendorf, Stüde, Triangel and Westerbeck. The seat of the municipality is in the village Westerbeck.

References

Gifhorn (district)